Bernard Parker Haigh, MBE (8 July 1884 – 18 January 1941) was a Scottish mechanical engineer. Haigh was educated at Allan Glen's School and the University of Glasgow He served as professor of applied mechanics at the Royal Naval College in Greenwich.

Haigh is known for his contributions in the fields of metal fatigue, welding and theory of plasticity. He is particularly known for Haigh diagram.

In 1913 Haigh became a lecturer in applied mechanics at the Royal Naval College.

Notable publications 
 A new machine for alternating load tests (1912)
 Report on Alternating Stress Tests of a Sample of Mild Steel received from the British Association Stress Committee (1916) 
 Experiments on the fatigue of brasses (1917)
 Strain-energy Function and the Elastic-limit (1920)
 Strain-energy Function and the Elastic limit (1922)
 Stresses in Bridges (1924)
 Hysteresis in relation to cohesion and fatigue (1928)
 Electric welding as an integral part of structural design (1939)

References
 

 
 
 
 
 
 
 
 
 
 

 
 
 
 

1884 births
1941 deaths
Scottish scholars and academics
Scottish mechanical engineers
Academics of the Royal Naval College, Greenwich
Alumni of the University of Glasgow
People educated at Allan Glen's School
Engineers from Edinburgh
Academics of the University of Glasgow
20th-century Scottish inventors
Members of the Order of the British Empire